Benjamin Pixley Birdsall (October 26, 1858 – May 16, 1916) was a three-term Republican U.S. Representative from Iowa's 3rd congressional district during the first decade of the 20th century.

Biography
Born in Weyauwega, Wisconsin, Birdsall attended the common schools of Iowa and the University of Iowa, Iowa City. He studied law, was admitted to the bar in 1878 and practiced in Clarion, Iowa. He served as district judge of the eleventh judicial district of Iowa from January 1893 to October 1900.

In 1902, Birdsall was elected as a Republican to the Fifty-eighth Congress, after the incumbent, Speaker of the United States House of Representatives David B. Henderson chose not to run for re-election. Birdsall defeated former Iowa Governor Horace Boies in that race. He was re-elected twice, serving in the Fifty-ninth, and Sixtieth Congresses.

In 1908, he filed for re-election a third time, but fellow Republicans Burton E. Sweet and Charles E. Pickett also sought the Republican nomination. In February 1908 Birdsall pulled out of the race, explaining that he wished to return to the practice of law. In all he served in Congress from March 4, 1903 to March 3, 1909. He resumed the practice of law in Clarion, where he died on May 16, 1916. He was interred in Evergreen Cemetery.

References

1858 births
1916 deaths
Iowa state court judges
People from Weyauwega, Wisconsin
People from Clarion, Iowa
University of Iowa alumni
Iowa lawyers
Republican Party members of the United States House of Representatives from Iowa
19th-century American politicians
19th-century American judges
19th-century American lawyers